Cook County Board of Commissioners 17th district is a electoral district for the Cook County Board of Commissioners.

The district was established in 1994, when the board transitioned from holding elections in individual districts, as opposed to the previous practice of holding a set of two at-large elections (one for ten seats from the city of Chicago and another for seven seats from suburban Cook County).

Geography

1994 boundaries
In its initial 1994 iteration, the district encompassed parts of the northwest, west, and southwest suburbs of Cook County.

2001 redistricting
New boundaries were adopted in August 2001, with redistricting taking place following the 2000 United States Census.

In regards to townships and equivalent jurisdictions, the district's redistricted boundaries included portions of the city of Chicago, as well as portions of Bremen, Elk Grove, Lemont, Leyden, Lyons, Maine, Northfield, Orland, Palos, Proviso, Wheeling, and Worth townships.

2012 redistricting
The district, as redistricted in 2012 following the 2010 United States Census, included parts of Bensenville, Berkeley, Burr Ridge, Brookfield, Chicago, Countryside, Des Plaines, Elk Grove Village, Elmhurst, Franklin Park, Hickory Hills, Hillsdale, Hillside, Hinsdale, Hodgkins, Homer Glen, Indian Head Park, Justice, La Grange, La Grange Park,  Lemont, Northlake, Orland Park, Orland Hills, Palos Heights, Palos Hills, Palos Park, Park Ridge, Riverside, Rosment, Schiller Park, Tinley, Western Springs, Westcherster, Worth, Willow Springs.

In regards to townships and equivalent jurisdictions, it included portions of the city of Chicago, as well as portions of Bremen, Elk Grove, Lemont, Leyden, Lyons, Orland, Palos, Proviso, Maine Riverside and Worth townships.

The district almost entirely lied in suburban Cook County, as the only part of Chicago in the district was O'Hare International Airport and its direct surroundings.

The district was 144.60 square miles (92,544.64 acres).

Politics
The district has only had Republican commissioners since its inception. The district has been considered solidly Republican. Nevertheless, it saw a close result in its most recent election, which saw an unprecedentedly strong and well-funded effort by the Cook County Democratic Party to target the district.

For decades after its inception, the district was considered to be a Republican stronghold. However, in the 2016 United States presidential election, the Democratic ticket of Hillary Clinton and Tim Kaine won a strong victory in the district over the Republican ticket of Donald Trump and Mike Pence.

The district is currently the district represented by a Republican commissioner, and the only one to never have been represented by the Democratic commissioner.

List of commissioners representing the district

Election results

|-
| colspan=16 style="text-align:center;" |Cook County Board of Commissioners 17th district general elections
|-
!Year
!Winning candidate
!Party
!Vote (pct)
!Opponent
!Party
! Vote (pct)
!Opponent
!Party
! Vote (pct)
|-
|1994
| |Herbert T. Schumann, Jr.
| |Republican
| | 54,502 (65.85%)
| | William Hurley
| |Democratic
| | 28,267 (34.15%)
| 
| 
| 
|-
|1998
| |Herbert T. Schumann, Jr.
| | Republican
| |50,720 (56.82%)
| | John K. Murphy
| | Democratic
| | 38,545 (43.18%)
| 
| 
| 
|-
|2002
| |Elizabeth "Liz" Doody Gorman
| | Republican
| |53,212 (100%)
| 
| 
| 
| 
| 
| 
|-
|2006
| |Elizabeth "Liz" Doody Gorman
| | Republican
| |49,425 (55.60%)
| | Thomas "Tommy" Kraus
| | Democratic
| | 39,473 (44.40%)
| 
| 
| 
|-
|2010
| |Elizabeth "Liz" Doody Gorman
| | Republican
| |56,423 (58.59%)
| | Patrick Maher
| | Democratic
| | 34,686 (36.02%)
| | Matthew J. Ogean
| | Green
| | 5,194 (5.39%)
|-
|2014
| |Elizabeth "Liz" Doody Gorman
| | Republican
| |56,926 (100%)
| 
| 
| 
| 
| 
| 
|-
|2018
| |Sean M. Morrison
| | Republican
| |61,572 (50.57%)
| | Abdelnasser Rashid
| | Democratic
| | 60,195 (49.43%)
| 
| 
| 
|-
|2022
| |Sean M. Morrison
| | Republican
| |55,426 (51.29%)
| | Daniel T. Calandriello
| | Democratic
| | 52,638 (48.71%)
| 
| 
|

References

Cook County Board of Commissioners districts
Constituencies established in 1994
1994 establishments in Illinois